"Golden Light" is a song by Norwegian artist Madden featuring vocals from 6AM. It was released as a digital download in Norway on 18 March 2016 through Warner Music Norway. The song has peaked to number 10 on the Norwegian Singles Chart.

Music video
A music video to accompany the release of "Golden Light" was first released onto YouTube on 12 May 2016 at a total length of three minutes and twenty-five seconds.

Track listing

Chart performance

Weekly charts

Year-end charts

Certifications

Release date

References

External links
 Official website
 Madden on Facebook

2016 songs
2016 singles